National Bangla High School is a secondary school located in Mirpur-2, Dhaka, Bangladesh. Founded in 1966, the school was originally an Urdu medium one.

Alumni
 Aslamul Haque was the member of parliament for Dhaka-14 from 2009 to 2021.
 Elias Uddin Mollah was elected to parliament for Dhaka-16 in 2008.

See also
 Education in Bangladesh

References

Schools in Dhaka District
1966 establishments in East Pakistan
Educational institutions established in 1966
High schools in Bangladesh